Muay Lao (lit. "Lao Boxing" ) is an ancient combat sport from Laos.  It incorporates punches, kicks, elbow, and knee strikes. It can be traced back to the 15th century when it was used for military combat during the Lan Xang dynasty. It is similar to Muay Thai from Thailand and Pradal Serey from Cambodia.  Muay Lao was an event at the 2009 Southeast Asian Games in Vientiane.

The martial art is related to other forms of martial arts found in other parts of the Angkor cultural sphere including Muay Thai in Thailand, Pradal Serey in Cambodia and Musti-yuddha in India.

See also
Lethwei
Muay Boran
Muay Thai
Pradal Serey
Tomoi
Bokator

References

External links
Vientiane Times
Vientiane Times-Provincial kick-boxers challenge city counterparts
Vietnam Royal Tourism
Former national kick-boxer returns for Vientiane event
Laos in pictures
Lao boxing video
Muay Lao, the forgotten art of kickboxing - from GoAbroad.net
UNESCO ICM Muay Lao

 
Combat sports
Sport in Laos